The term orphan car accurately applies to any marque of motor vehicle built by a manufacturer that has discontinued business entirely. The term is sometimes inaccurately applied to a discontinued marque from a still-existing vehicle manufacturer (e.g. Oldsmobile) or a sub-marque (e.g. Thunderbird).  In the case of a revived marque, a discontinued one revived by a newer company (e.g. Maybach), only the original vehicles are accurately considered orphans.

Discontinued marques from existing manufacturers

Chrysler Group
DeSoto
Eagle
Imperial
Plymouth

Ford Motor Company
Continental
Edsel
Mercury

General Motors Corporation
Marquette
Geo
La Salle
Saturn
Oakland
Oldsmobile
Hummer
Viking
Pontiac

Volkswagen Group
Auto Union
DKW
Horch
Wanderer
NSU Motorenwerke

Others
Checker
DeLorean
Nash
 Rambler 
 American Motors (AMC)
Hudson
Studebaker
Pierce Arrow
Apollo
Hispano Suiza
Austin-Healey
Rover
Triumph
Kaiser
Willys
Henry J
Crosley Motors
Tucker
Packard
Tatra
Saab
Bricklin

Steam / Electric
Baker
Commuter Vehicles, Inc.
Doble
Edison-Ford
Sebring Vanguard
Stanley
White

See also
 List of automobile manufacturers
 List of car brands

References

Automotive terminology